The 2008–09 Eastern Michigan Eagles men's basketball team represented Eastern Michigan University during the 2008–09 NCAA Division I men's basketball season. The Eagles, led by 4th year head coach Charles E. Ramsey, played their home games at the Eastern Michigan University Convocation Center and were members of the West Division of the Mid-American Conference. They finished the season 8–24, 6–10 in MAC play. They team finished 4th in the MAC West. They were knocked out in the 1st round of the MAC Tournament by Central Michigan.

Roster
The team captains were Tyler Jones, Wendale Farrow.

Source:

Coaching staff

Schedule

Source:

Awards
All-MAC Second Team

Brandon Bowdry

References

Eastern Michigan Eagles men's basketball seasons
Eastern Michigan
2008 in sports in Michigan
2009 in sports in Michigan